Edward Cecot (born 1 July 1974) is a Polish former footballer.

References

1974 births
Sportspeople from Szczecin
Living people
Polish footballers
Association football defenders
KP Chemik Police players
Stilon Gorzów Wielkopolski players
Warta Poznań players
Zagłębie Lubin players
Śląsk Wrocław players
OKS Stomil Olsztyn players
Ruch Chorzów players
GKS Bełchatów players
Ekstraklasa players